Gwalia in Khasia is a 1995 travelogue by Welsh author Nigel Jenkins. Published by Gomer, it won the Wales Book of the Year in 1996.

Synopsis
Gwalia in Khasia tells the story of the Welsh Calvinistic Methodists' Mission to the Khasi Hills in north-east India between 1841–1969.

Reception
In 1996, Gwalia in Khasia won the Wales Book of the Year award. In the obituary for Jenkins published in The Independent in 2014, Meic Stephens noted that the book: "was compared by competent critics to the work of such travel-writers as Jan Morris and Paul Theroux."

Khasia in Gwalia
Jenkins also edited an accompanying anthology of poetry and prose from the Khasi Hills, entitled Khasia in Gwalia.

References

1995 non-fiction books
British travel books
Welsh non-fiction books
Books about India